Charles Brearley House is located in Trenton, Mercer County, New Jersey, United States. The building was built in 1855 and was added to the National Register of Historic Places on April 14, 1995.

See also
National Register of Historic Places listings in Mercer County, New Jersey

References

Houses in Trenton, New Jersey
Houses on the National Register of Historic Places in New Jersey
Houses completed in 1855
Italianate architecture in New Jersey
National Register of Historic Places in Trenton, New Jersey
New Jersey Register of Historic Places